The 1924 Turkish Football Championship was the first edition of the competition and the first national championship ever in Turkish football. It was held in September. All matches were played at İstiklal Sahası in the capital Ankara. 

Harbiye won their first championship title unbeaten and without conceding a single goal by defeating Bahriye 3–0 in the final and became the first national champions in Turkish football history, with two more titles to follow in 1942 and 1945 under the name Harp Okulu. For Bahriye it was the sole appearance in the championship final and their sole participation in the competition altogether.

Harbiye and Bahriye (both from Istanbul) formed an exception in the inaugural edition of the tournament, since they were included by the Turkish Football Federation in the championship as military clubs and not as champions of a civilian regional league. All other participants qualified as regional champions for the competition played in knock-out format.

Qualified clubs

 The champions of Canik (Samsun) and Antalya regions are currently not known.
 In 1924 Trabzon Lisesi were champions of the Trabzon League, though a second tournament was held after the conclusion of the league in order to determine the participants for the Turkish championship.  İdman Ocağı won that tournament and qualified for the national championship.

First round

 1 Match could not be finished for lack of time. The remaining 15 minutes were played on 5 September.
 2 The team of Canik did not show up. Edirne received a bye for the quarter-finals.
 3 Only the first half was played. Second half played on 6 September.

Resumed matches

 Altay received a bye for the quarter-finals.

Quarter-finals

Semi-finals

Third place match

Final

References

External links
RSSSF

Turkish Football Championship seasons
Turkish
Turkey